"The One Who Loves You Now" is a song by Swedish recording artist and former ABBA member Agnetha Fältskog. Internationally, the first single from "A" was When You Really Loved Someone.
The song was released as a single on CD in the United Kingdom on November 25, 2013.

Background

"The One Who Loves You Now" was written by Jörgen Elofsson together with Pär Westerlund a few years before Fältskog was approached to make a recording. Though the song wasn't written with Fältskog in mind, it was one of the first songs that Elofsson played to her when discussing a possible future album project. Fältskog apparently liked the song very much and chose to record it as the very first track for her album  A.
When asked about the final result, Pär Westerlund stated that the song "sounds very good" and that he was "very proud to be involved in that project".

Chart performance

Weekly charts

Radio and release history

References 

2013 singles
Agnetha Fältskog songs
Songs written by Jörgen Elofsson
2012 songs
Universal Music Group singles